The Zhongzhou Avenue is a  long road in Zhengzhou, Henan, China. As a boundary between old Zhengzhou urban area and Zhengdong New Area, the road is extremely important to Zhengzhou urban traffic. Part of the road (G30 Lianhuo Expressway–Zhengxin Highway section) is a limited access urban expressway and is among the busiest routes in Zhengzhou urban expressway system.

History
This road was completed in 1989 as G107 highway Zhengzhou section. When completed, the road was in the eastern suburban area of Zhengzhou. With the city development, especially after the establishment of the Zhengdong New Area in 2003, the eastern part of Zhengzhou has been growing rapidly and the road began to serve as an urban road as well. As a result, the road became very congested. To relieve traffic congestion, the Zhengzhou section of G107 highway was moved to the east in 2004. The former section was often referred to as "Old 107" and began to serve only as an urban road.

In 2006, the former G107 highway Zhengzhou section was officially renamed as Zhongzhou Avenue.

The road has undergone many widening and reformation work over its life. The elevation project of the northern and southern sections of the road was finished in 2014 and the interchanges with Longhai Expressway and Nongye Expressway were completed in 2016, making the road fully connected to other expressways in Zhengzhou's double rings and "井" shaped urban expressway plan.

Exit list

From north to south:

References

Expressways in Zhengzhou